The 1962–63 LFF Lyga was the 42nd season of the LFF Lyga football competition in Lithuania.  It was contested by 24 teams, and Statyba Panevezys won the championship.

Group I

Group II

League standings

References
RSSSF

LFF Lyga seasons
1963 in Lithuania
1962 in Lithuania
LFF
LFF